This article contains information about the literary events and publications of 1559.

Events
April – The Act of Uniformity sets the order of prayer in accordance with a new version of the Book of Common Prayer.
Before August – Pope Paul IV promulgates the Pauline Index, an early version of the Index Librorum Prohibitorum.

New books

Prose
Jacques Amyot (translator)
Daphnis et Chloë, from Longus' Daphnis and Chloe
Vies des hommes illustres, from Plutarch's Parallel Lives (begins)
Joachim du Bellay – Discours au roi
Realdo Colombo – De Re Anatomica
Jorge de Montemayor – Diana
Die Magdeburger Centurien (Magdeburg Centuries, first three volumes, publication continues up to 1574)

Drama
Jasper Heywood – Translation of Seneca the Younger's Troas

Poetry
See 1559 in poetry

Births
February 18 – Isaac Casaubon, Genevan classicist and church historian (died 1614)
October 12 – Jacques Sirmond, Jesuit scholar (died 1651)
December – Lupercio Leonardo de Argensola, dramatist and poet (died 1613)
unknown dates
Luis Cabrera de Córdoba, Spanish historian (died 1623)
Christopher Holywood, Jesuit writer (died 1626)
John Penry, Protestant pamphleteer and martyr (died 1593)

Deaths
January – Steven Mierdman, printer (born c. 1510)
May 19 – Pierre Doré, theologian (born c. 1500)
August 15 – Luigi Lippomano, hagiographer (born 1500)
August 25 – Nicholas Tacitus Zegers, Bible exegete (born c. 1495)
September 7 – Robert Estienne, printer (born 1503)
Probable year of death – Sebastián Fox Morcillo, philosopher

References

Years of the 16th century in literature